Christer Gulldén  (born 13 August 1960) is a Swedish wrestler. He competed in the 1988 Summer Olympics, where he reached the bronze final in Men's Greco-Roman 90 kg. His international results include a bronze medal at the 1981 European Championship.

He is uncle to handball player Isabelle Gulldén.

References

External links

1960 births
Living people 
Sportspeople from Gothenburg 
Swedish male sport wrestlers
Olympic wrestlers of Sweden 
Wrestlers at the 1988 Summer Olympics